Plants and Animals is the 2003 debut EP by Plants and Animals. The band describes its first release as "An early epic instrumental folk [that] has little in common with their later work, beyond tight-arse musicianship."

Track listing 

"Boyfriends and Girlfriends" – 15:49
"Jacques ..." – 7:15
"Thundergongs" – 9:32
"Working Man" – 11:41
"... Making Us Weaker" – 7:27

This is reference 1.
This is reference 2.

References

2003 EPs
Plants and Animals albums